Hygromiinae is a taxonomic subfamily of land snails, terrestrial gastropod molluscs in the family Hygromiidae, the hairy snails and their allies.

Tribes
 tribe Hygromiini Tryon, 1866 - synonym: Cernuellini Schileyko, 1991
 Hygromia Risso, 1826
 Zenobiellina D. T. Holyoak & G. A. Holyoak, 2018
 tribe Perforatellini Neiber, Razkin & Hausdorf, 2017
 Chilanodon Westerlund, 1897
 Kovacsia H. Nordsieck, 1993
 Lindholmomneme F. Haas, 1936
 Lozekia Hudec, 1970
 Monachoides Gude & B. B. Woodward, 1921
 Noneulota Schileyko & Horsák, 2007
 Perforatella Schlüter, 1838
 Pseudotrichia Schileyko, 1970
 Stygius Schileyko, 1970

References

 Bank, R. A. (2017). Classification of the Recent terrestrial Gastropoda of the World. Last update: July 16th, 2017
 Fauna Europeana
 Taxonomy of the Gastropoda (Bouchet & Rocroi, 2005)

Hygromiidae